The men's heptathlon event  at the 1998 European Athletics Indoor Championships was held on 28 February–1 March.

Results

References

Combined events at the European Athletics Indoor Championships
Heptathlon